Carite is a barrio in the municipality of Guayama, Puerto Rico. Its population in 2010 was 1,210.

History
Puerto Rico was ceded by Spain in the aftermath of the Spanish–American War under the terms of the Treaty of Paris of 1898 and became an unincorporated territory of the United States. In 1899, the United States Department of War conducted a census of Puerto Rico finding that the population of Carite barrio was 834.

See also

 List of communities in Puerto Rico

References

Barrios of Guayama, Puerto Rico